Chayerlu (also Romanized as Chāyerlū and Chāy Yerlū; also known as Chehārlu) is a village in Qoltuq Rural District, in the Central District of Zanjan County, Zanjan Province, Iran. At the 2006 census, its population was 742, in 152 families.

References 

Populated places in Zanjan County